Qigong fever, also known as the qigong boom, was a social phenomenon in the People's Republic of China during the 1980s and 1990s, in which the practice of qigong rose to extraordinary popularity, with mass daily practice. At its peak, it is estimated that the number of qigong practitioners reached between 60 and 200 million, developing a flourishing subculture.

History 

The Chinese term , referred to in English as "the qigong boom" or "qigong fever", was a social phenomenon in which mass practice of qigong became extraordinarily popular in the People's Republic of China during the 1980s and 1990s, with more than 2,000 qigong organizations and between 60 and 200 million practitioners.  The movement is characterized by initial government sanction of qigong, with emphasis on health benefits, traditional medicine and martial arts applications, and a scientific perspective; revival of interest in traditional philosophy, spiritual attainment, and folklore; rise to power of "grandmasters" (e.g. Zhang Baosheng) as cultural and political leaders; and opposing efforts to legitimize qigong based on science versus de-legitimize qigong as pseudoscience.  In 1999, the Chinese government instituted a systematic crackdown on qigong organizations that were perceived to challenge state control, including prohibiting mass qigong practice, shutdown of qigong clinics and hospitals, and banning groups such as Zhong Gong and Falun Gong.

See also
 Heterodox teachings (Chinese law)

References

Further reading 

Qigong
History of the People's Republic of China